Faridpur-4 is a constituency represented in the Jatiya Sangsad (National Parliament) of Bangladesh since 2014 by independent politician Mujibur Rahman Chowdhury.

Boundaries 
The constituency encompasses Bhanga and Charbhadrasan upazilas, and all but one union parishad of Sadarpur Upazila: Krishnapur.

History 
The constituency was created for the first general elections in newly independent Bangladesh, held in 1973.

Ahead of the 2008 general election, the Election Commission redrew constituency boundaries to reflect population changes revealed by the 2001 Bangladesh census. The 2008 redistricting altered the boundaries of the constituency.

Members of Parliament

Elections

Elections in the 2010s 
General Election 2018

General Election 2014

Elections in the 2000s 

Abdur Razzaq stood for two seats in the 2001 general election: Faridpur-4 and Shariatpur-3. After winning both, he chose to represent the latter and quit the former, triggering a by-election. Chowdhury Akmal Ibne Yusuf was elected in a January 2002 by-election.

Mosharaf Hossain died in August 1999. His widow, Saleha Mosharraf, was elected in an October by-election.

Elections in the 1990s

References

External links
 

Parliamentary constituencies in Bangladesh
Faridpur District